"Thy Holy Wings" (originally "Bred dina vida vingar" literally "Spread your wide wings") is a Swedish metrical psalm setting with lyrics by Lina Sandell in 1860 and reworked in 1865 to a Danish or Swedish folk melody.

References

Psalm settings
Swedish songs
Lutheran hymns
1860 songs